The 2014 Varsity Rugby competitions were contested from 27 January to 7 April 2014. Varsity Rugby is the collective name of four rugby union competitions played between several university teams in South Africa, with the Varsity Cup being the premier competition. The 2014 season was the seventh edition of this tournament.

Rules
All four 2014 Varsity Rugby competitions used a different scoring system to the regular system. Tries were worth five points as usual, but conversions were worth three points, while penalties and drop goals were only worth two points.

All Varsity Cup games also had two referees officiating each game, props' jerseys featured a special gripping patch to ensure better binding, intended to reduce collapsing scrums and the mark was extended to the entire field.

Varsity Cup

Varsity Shield

Promotion/relegation play-offs

2015 Varsity Cup play-off

  remain in the Varsity Cup for 2015.
  remain in the Varsity Shield for 2015.

2015 Varsity Shield play-off

  remain in the Varsity Shield for 2015.

Young Guns

Competition Rules

There were eight participating universities in the 2014 Young Guns competition. These teams were divided into two pools (the FNB pool and the Steinhoff pool) and played the other teams in the pool once over the course of the season, either home or away.

Teams received four points for a win and two points for a draw. Bonus points were awarded to teams that scored four or more tries in a game, as well as to teams that lost a match by seven points or less. Teams were ranked by log points, then points difference (points scored less points conceded).

The top two teams in each pool qualified for the title play-offs. In the semi-finals, the teams that finished first had home advantage against the teams that finished second in their respective pools. The winners of these semi-finals played each other in the final.

Teams

Standings

The final league standings for the 2014 Varsity Cup Young Guns were:

Fixtures and results

The 2014 Varsity Young Guns fixtures were as follows:

 All times are South African (GMT+2).

Round one

Round two

Round three

Round four

Round five

Round six

Semi-finals

Final

 The  beat  in a kick-off after the match ended in a 17–all draw after extra time.

Honours

Koshuis Rugby Championship

Competition Rules

There were eight participating teams in the 2014 Koshuis Rugby Championship competition, the winners of the internal leagues of each of the eight Varsity Cup teams. These teams were divided into two pools and each team played every team in their pool once over the course of the season, either home or away.

Teams received four points for a win and two points for a draw. Bonus points were awarded to teams that scored four or more tries in a game, as well as to teams that lost a match by seven points or less. Teams were ranked by log points, then points difference (points scored less points conceded).

The top two teams in each pool qualified for the semi-finals.

Teams

Standings

The league standings for the 2014 Koshuis Rugby Championship were:

Fixtures and results

The 2014 Koshuis Rugby Championship fixtures were as follows:

 All times are South African (GMT+2).

Round one

Round two

Round three

Round four

Round five

Semi-finals

Final

Honours

See also

 Varsity Cup
 2014 Currie Cup Premier Division
 2014 Currie Cup First Division
 2014 Vodacom Cup

References

External links
 
 
 
 

2014
2014 in South African rugby union
Varsity Rugby